Jupp may refer to:

 Jupp (given name), a German masculine given name
 Jupp (surname), a surname
 jupp, a cross-platform text editor forked from Joe's Own Editor

See also
 Jup (disambiguation)